Samuel Cook Edsall (February 15, 1860 – February 17, 1917) was a  bishop of North Dakota and Minnesota in The Episcopal Church.

Biography
The son of James K. Edsall, Illinois Attorney General, and Caroline Florella More, Edsall graduated from Racine College, and after admission to the bar in 1882, initially followed his father's career, practicing law in Chicago.

However, Edsall became increasingly drawn to spiritual matters. He attended Western Theological Seminary, was ordained deacon on December 23, 1888, and priest on June 2, 1889, by Bishop William Edward McLaren. He served as rector of St. Peter's church in Chicago for a decade.

The 1898 General Convention chose Edsall as the Missionary Bishop of North Dakota and he was consecrated in Chicago on January 25, 1899.

In June 6, 1901, he was elected Coadjutor Bishop of Minnesota, and upon the death of bishop Henry Whipple, he succeeded as diocesan. He was installed on October 3, 1901. He then moved to Minneapolis and made it the new headquarters of the Diocese of Minnesota. He served 16 years, dying in office and succeeded by his suffragan, Frank McElwain.

References and external links 

 New York Times reports his election as bishop
 New York Times obituary

External links
 

1860 births
1917 deaths
Episcopal bishops of Minnesota
People from Dixon, Illinois
Illinois lawyers
Racine College alumni
Seabury-Western Theological Seminary alumni
19th-century American lawyers
19th-century American Episcopalians
Episcopal bishops of North Dakota